Gun laws in Maryland regulate the sale, possession, and use of firearms and ammunition in the U.S. state of Maryland.

Summary of Maryland gun laws and regulations

State constitution
The Constitution of Maryland contains no provision protecting the right for individuals to keep and bear arms. The state preempts some local firearm regulations, though local governments may regulate firearms with respect to minors and areas of public assembly. Annapolis, Anne Arundel County, Montgomery County, Gaithersburg, and Baltimore are known to have local firearm regulations.

The Constitution of Maryland, Declaration of Rights, Art. 2. The Constitution of the United States, and the Laws made, or which shall be made, in pursuance thereof, and all Treaties made, or which shall be made, under the authority of the United States, are, and shall be the Supreme Law of the State; and the Judges of this State, and all the People of this State, are, and shall be bound thereby; anything in the Constitution or Law of this State to the contrary. Maryland state law currently blocks anyone who has been in a mental facility or has been reported or coded as mentally ill from buying a gun notwithstanding.

Regulated firearms
The Maryland State Police maintain a registry of "regulated firearms" that are allowed to be sold within the state. 

Residents may only purchase handguns manufactured after January 1, 1985, that are on the approved handguns list from the Maryland Handgun Roster.

Integrated Ballistics Identification System
Until 2016, dealers were required to forward the manufacturer-included shell casing (or one provided by the federally licensed gun shop) in its sealed container to the Department of State Police Crime Laboratory upon sale, rental, or transfer of a "regulated firearm" for inclusion in their ballistics database, known as the Integrated Ballistics Identification System (IBIS). The program was shut down in 2015 due to its ineffectiveness.

Laws prohibiting firearms
On April 4, 2013, the Maryland General Assembly approved legislation imposing significant new restrictions on gun ownership. The bills ban the sale of certain semi-automatic firearms that they define as assault weapons, limit magazine capacity to ten rounds, require that handgun purchasers be fingerprinted and pass a training class in order to obtain a handgun license, and bar persons who have been involuntarily committed to a mental health institution from possessing firearms. Martin O'Malley Governor at the time, signed the legislation into law on May 16, 2013. Regarding 10-round magazine limits for rifles purchased in Maryland, standard 30-round magazines may be purchased outside Maryland and brought into the state for personal use. Those standard magazines may not be transferred, given, sold or manufactured inside Maryland.

As of October 1, 2013, detachable magazines for semi-automatic handguns and semi-automatic centerfire rifles which are capable of holding more than 10 rounds may not be purchased, manufactured or sold, though they may be possessed (but not transferred within the state) by persons who already owned them prior to enactment of the 2013 changes. Magazines greater than ten rounds may be purchased or acquired outside the state and carried into Maryland and used within the state. Certain pistols are classified as "assault pistols", and banned from ownership if not registered prior to August 1, 1994. Only handguns on the official handgun roster may be sold in the state. Private sales of "regulated firearms," which includes handguns, are permissible, but must be done at a local Maryland State Police barracks. As of 1 Oct, a Handgun Qualification License (HQL) is required for the sale, as well as a background check and a mandatory seven-day waiting period. A person must obtain a safety training certificate prior to purchasing "regulated firearms" and present that certificate prior to each purchase. With some limited exceptions for designated firearms collectors, only one "regulated firearm" may be purchased in any 30-day period. Handguns manufactured on or before December 31, 2002, must be sold or transferred with an external safety lock. Handguns manufactured after December 31, 2002 may only be sold or transferred if they have an internal mechanical safety device.

Firearms advocates challenged the 2013 law. The District Court ruled that the law was constitutional based on intermediate scrutiny. On February 1, 2016, the United States Court of Appeals for the Fourth Circuit overruled the reasoning used to uphold the law in a 2-to-1 vote. The appellate court said that the ban on semi-automatic weapons and high-capacity magazines should be subject to strict scrutiny, not intermediate scrutiny, because they "are in common use by law-abiding citizens." The court acknowledged that the state has a right to limit the use of or ban citizen possession, sale, or transfer of "dangerous and unusual" weapons (such as hand grenades), but the weapons and ammunition barred by the 2013 law did not fall under that provision. The appellate court remanded the case to a federal district court, leaving the ban temporarily in place pending a review by the district court. The state said it would appeal the decision. On March 4, 2016, Fourth Circuit agreed to rehear the case en banc and oral arguments took place on May 11, 2016. The full court ruled that such assault weapons and magazines holding more than 10 rounds are not protected by the Second Amendment; the Supreme Court refused to hear the case.

Firearms are prohibited from certain places, including schools and demonstrations.

In 2022 Maryland governor Larry Hogan allowed legislation that will, according to The Washington Post, "ban the sale, receipt and transfer of unfinished frames or receivers that are not serialized by the manufacturer" to become law without his signature. This law will also ban the mere possession of such items starting in March 2023.

Open and concealed carry
Carrying a handgun, whether openly or concealed, is prohibited except in limited events such as hunting or, unless one has a permit to carry a handgun or is on their own property or their own place of business. The Maryland State Police shall issue a permit to carry a handgun once an individual meets the minimum permitting requirements. Following the NYSRPA v. Bruen Supreme Court ruling, no state can require an individual to show "Good Cause" nor can a State require a "Good and substantial reason" for an individual to obtain a permit to carry a handgun. Permits are not automatically renewed. Out of a total population of 6 million, there were 14,298 active carry permits as of April 2014. No permit is required to openly carry a rifle or shotgun in Maryland.

On August 5, 2019, Maryland State Police issued a new S.O.P. SOP 29-19-004 which rescinded the previous SOP 29-15-007. 
On March 5, 2012, a federal judge ruled in Woollard v Sheridan that Maryland's "may issue" concealed carry law is unconstitutional, writing, "A citizen may not be required to offer a 'good and substantial reason' why he should be permitted to exercise his rights." The Maryland Attorney General's office appealed the ruling. On March 21, 2013, a three judge panel of the Fourth Circuit Court of Appeals (U.S. Federal) unanimously overturned the District Court ruling, holding that the "good & substantial cause" requirements imposed by Maryland law are permissible without violating the 2nd Amendment.

On June 23, 2022, the United States Supreme Court ruled in New York State Rifle & Pistol Association, Inc. v.Bruen that New York's "may issue" concealed carry law is unconstitutional, writing, "New York’s proper-cause requirement violates the Fourteenth Amendment by preventing law-abiding citizens with ordinary self-defense needs from exercising their Second Amendment right to keep and bear arms in public". Although this does not specifically target the laws passed in Maryland, it upholds the March 5, 2012 decision in Woollard v Sheridan and opens the way for litigation that, based on this U.S. Supreme Court precedent, will likely prevail over objections from the State of Maryland.

Maryland police have been accused of targeting drivers from other states including Florida because they hold concealed-carry permits.

References

Maryland law
Maryland